Sodium apolate (INN) or lyapolate sodium (USAN) is a vasoprotective.

Organic sodium salts
Vinyl polymers
Sulfonates